Brodski Stupnik is a municipality in Brod-Posavina County, Croatia that is part of the Slavonski Brod built-up area. There were 3,036 inhabitants in the 2011 census in which 95% declared themselves Croats. Brodski Stupnik is a centre for wine making.

The people live in four settlements:

 Brodski Stupnik
 Krajačići
 Lovčić
 Stari Slatinik

References

 

Municipalities of Croatia
Populated places in Brod-Posavina County